Self Made Man is the fourth studio album by American band Larkin Poe. It was released on June 12, 2020 under Tricki-Woo Records.

Critical reception
Self Made Man was met with "generally favorable" reviews from critics. At Metacritic, which assigns a weighted average rating out of 100 to reviews from mainstream publications, this release received an average score of 78, based on 7 reviews. Aggregator Album of Year gave the album 77 out of 100 based on a critical consensus of 8 reviews.

Track listing

Charts

References

2020 albums